Ryuya Mura (武良竜也, Mura Ryūya, born 3 July 1996) is a Japanese breaststroke swimmer. He competed in the 2020 Summer Olympics.
,

References

1996 births
Living people
Swimmers at the 2020 Summer Olympics
Japanese male breaststroke swimmers
Olympic swimmers of Japan
People from Yonago, Tottori
Sportspeople from Tottori Prefecture
Universiade medalists in swimming
21st-century Japanese people
Universiade bronze medalists for Japan
Medalists at the 2017 Summer Universiade